This is a list of defunct airlines from Guatemala.

See also
List of airlines of Guatemala
List of airports in Guatemala

References

Airlines
Airlines, defunct
Guatemala